Marcin Nowak (born 2 August 1977 in Stalowa Wola) is a former track and field sprint athlete who competed internationally for Poland.

Nowak represented Poland at the 2008 Summer Olympics in Beijing. He competed at the 4x100 metres relay together with Marcin Jędrusiński, Dariusz Kuć and Łukasz Chyła. In their qualification heat they did not finish due to a mistake in the baton exchange and they were eliminated.

Competition record

Personal bests
Outdoor
100 metres – 10.21 (+0.4 m/s) (Kraków 2000)
200 metres – 20.51 (+0.1 m/s) (Kraków 2000)
Indoor
60 metres – 6.61 (Spała 1999)
200 metres – 21.32 (Chemnitz 2009)

References
 

1977 births
Living people
Polish male sprinters
Olympic athletes of Poland
Athletes (track and field) at the 2000 Summer Olympics
Athletes (track and field) at the 2008 Summer Olympics
People from Stalowa Wola
European Athletics Championships medalists
Sportspeople from Podkarpackie Voivodeship